Mount Peres (Tall al-Faras, Har Peres) is a volcanic mountain located in central Golan Heights, some  east of Moshav Keshet. The mountain is the southernmost of a series of dormant volcanoes that stretch up to the northern parts of the Golan Heights.

References

Mountains of the Golan Heights
Volcanoes of the Golan Heights